John Nelson may refer to:

Arts and entertainment
John L. Nelson (1916–2001), American musician, father of singer Prince
John Nelson (conductor) (born 1941), American conductor
John Nelson (visual effects artist) (born 1953), American visual effects supervisor
John Randall Nelson (born 1956), painter and sculptor based in Phoenix, Arizona
John Allen Nelson (born 1959), American actor in film and television
John Mark Nelson (born 1993), songwriter and producer based in Minneapolis, Minnesota
John Arthur Nelson, director, actor, and writer

Politics
John M. Nelson (1870–1955), American political figure from Wisconsin
John E. Nelson (Maine politician) (1874–1955), American political figure from Maine
Jock Nelson (John Norman Nelson, 1908–1991), Australian politician
John E. Nelson (Nebraska politician) (born 1935), American political figure in Nebraska
John B. Nelson (born 1936), American political figure in Arizona

Sports
Candy Nelson (John W. Nelson, 1849–1910), American baseball player
John Nelson (pitcher), American baseball player
John Nelson (English cricketer) (1891–1917), English cricketer
John Nelson (soccer, born 1905) (1905–1984), Scottish-born American soccer player
Byron Nelson (John Byron Nelson, Jr., 1912–2006), American golfer
John Nelson (footballer) (born 1934), Australian rules footballer
John Nelson (swimmer) (born 1948), American swimmer
Johnny Nelson (born 1967), British boxer
John Nelson (New Zealand cricketer) (born 1975), New Zealand cricketer
John Nelson (infielder) (born 1979), American baseball player
John Nelson (soccer, born 1998), American soccer player

Others
John Nelson (British Army officer) (1912–1993), Commandant of the British Sector in Berlin
John Nelson (convert), 16th-century English convert to Islam
John Nelson (lawyer) (1791–1860), Attorney General of the United States in the 19th century
John Nelson (martyr) (1534–1578), Catholic priest, killed for refusal to acknowledge Queen's supremacy over Church in England
John Nelson (merchant) (1654–1734), American colonial figure in Boston
John Nelson (physician), physician, president of the American Medical Association
John Nelson (police officer) (1928–2003), American policeman, regarded as founder of police special forces units
John Nelson (businessman) (born 1947), chairman of Lloyd's of London
John Yeates Nelson (1850–1932), Australian public servant

See also
Jack Nelson (disambiguation)
Jon Nelson (disambiguation)
Jonathan Nelson (disambiguation)
John Nelson House (disambiguation)